National Highway 35 (NH 35) is a  National Highway in India. This highway runs entirely in the state Uttar Pradesh.

Route
Kabrai, Banda, Karwi, Mau, Allahabad, Mirzapur, Varanasi.

Junctions  

  Terminal near Kabrai.
  near Banda.
  near Chitrakoot.
  near Raipura.
  near Jamira.
  near Allahabad.
  Terminal near Varanasi.

References

External links
 NH 35 on OpenStreetMap

National highways in India
National Highways in Uttar Pradesh
Transport in Varanasi district